"Du får inte" is a song written by Sonja Aldén, and recorded by herself on her 2008 album Under mitt tak. In September 2008, it was released as a single.

Charts

References

2008 singles
Sonja Aldén songs
Swedish-language songs
2008 songs
Songs written by Sonja Aldén